Protein TFG is a protein that in humans is encoded by the TFG gene.

Interactions 

TFG (gene) has been shown to interact with PLSCR1.

References

Further reading

External links